Ruth Crombie Robinson Carroll (September 24, 1899, Lancaster, New York – December 5, 1999, Stamford, Connecticut) and "Archer" Latrobe Carroll (January 5, 1894 – November 30, 1996) were an American married couple that created children's books illustrated by Ruth. They received the Juvenile Award of the American Association of University Women, North Carolina chapter, in 1953 for Peanut and in 1955 for Digby the Only Dog. They lived in Asheville, North Carolina.

In the U.S. Library of Congress Catalog, the five earliest records of works by Ruth Carroll are for solo picture books published from 1932 to 1937 (unpaginated, as many as 48 pages). The earliest is What Whiskers Did, a story without words (Macmillan, 1932). In 1937, she created „Chessie and Her Kittens“ for the Chesapeake and Ohio Railway. The earliest joint work in the catalog is [The?] Flight of the Silver Bird (NY: J. Messner, Inc., 1939), 94 pp., . About 20 of their books were covered by Kirkus Reviews, perhaps beginning with Scuffles, the subject of a starred blurb in 1943. 

The Tatum series features a boy, Beanie Tatum, pet dog Tough Enough, and their family, who live in the Smoky Mountains. The last four of six Tatum books were starred in Kirkus Reviews.
 Beanie (1953) 
 Tough Enough
 Tough Enough's Trip
 Tough Enough's Pony
 Tough Enough and Sassy (1958)
 Tough Enough's Indians (1960)
 Ruth and Latrobe Carroll published Pet Tale 1949 Scuffles in 1943Salt and Pepper 1952

Ruth's latest work in LC Catalog is a picture book written with Latrobe, Hullabaloo, the elephant dog (NY: Walck, 1975), 48 pp., featuring a dog employed by a one-ring circus (Kirkus).

References

External links
 Ruth and Latrobe Carroll Papers, 1952–1960 (guide) at The University of North Carolina at Greensboro
 Search: 'ruth latrobe carroll' at Kirkus Reviews (about 20 reviews)
 
 Ruth Carroll at LC Authorities, with 50 records 1932–1975 (previous page of browse report, under 'Carroll, Ruth, 1899–' without '1999')
 Latrobe and Ruth Carroll at WorldCat

American children's writers
Married couples
American centenarians
Men centenarians
Writers from Asheville, North Carolina
Women centenarians